Scott Sherman is a former member of the San Diego City Council, representing District 7 in San Diego, California. He took office December 3, 2012 and was re-elected in 2016. He is a Republican, although city council positions are officially nonpartisan per state law.

District 7 includes the neighborhoods of Allied Gardens, Del Cerro, Linda Vista, Mission Valley, San Carlos, Serra Mesa, Tierrasanta, and Lake Murray.

Personal information
Sherman grew up in a military family. He has lived in San Diego since he was 5 months old. He attended Patrick Henry High School and Grossmont Community College. He is an insurance agent, with a focus on maritime insurance. He is an avid boater and fisherman. He and his wife, the former Norma Mouett, live in the Allied Gardens neighborhood near where he grew up.

Public service

San Diego City Council

Sherman ran for the District 7 council seat in the 2012 election after District 7 incumbent Marti Emerald decided to run in the newly created District 9 seat. Sherman was recruited to run by then-councilmember Carl DeMaio. He had not previously been active in politics.

In the June 2012 primary he earned 50.09% of the vote, edging out three competitors to win the seat outright and avoid a November runoff. He took office December 3, 2012.

Sherman was part of a coordinated three-person slate supported by the local Republican Party in an attempt to gain a Republican majority on the nine-member council. Sherman and fellow Republican Mark Kersey won their seats, but the third candidate, Ray Ellis, lost to incumbent Sherri Lightner, so that the council retained a 5-4 Democratic majority.

Sherman was elected to a second term in June 2016. He was termed out of his council position in 2020 and was replaced by Raul Campillo.

Committee assignments 
 Audit Committee (Chair)
 Budget Review Committee
 Environment Committee
 Land Use and Housing Committee

Source: Office of the City Clerk

2020 San Diego mayoral election candidacy

On November 27, 2019, Sherman filed as a candidate in the 2020 San Diego mayoral election. He was the only Republican candidate to enter the race. He was narrowly eliminated in the primary.

Electoral history

References

San Diego City Council members
American businesspeople in insurance
Businesspeople from San Diego
Living people
California Republicans
Year of birth missing (living people)